"Straight A's in Love" is a song written and originally recorded by Johnny Cash.

The song was released by Sun Records as a single (Sun 334, with "I Love You Because" on the opposite side) in December 1959, when Cash had already left the label for Columbia.

Charts

References 

Johnny Cash songs
1959 songs
1959 singles
Songs written by Johnny Cash
Sun Records singles